The 1926 South American Championships in Athletics  were held in Montevideo, Uruguay between 15 and 20 April.

Medal summary

Men's events

Medal table

External links
 Men Results – GBR Athletics
 Women Results – GBR Athletics

S
South American Championships in Athletics
A
1926 in South American sport
1926 in Uruguayan sport